The Lone Star Ranger is a lost 1919 American silent Western film based on the 1915 novel by Zane Grey and stars William Farnum. The film was directed by J. Gordon Edwards and produced and distributed by Fox Film Corporation. Portions of the film were shot in Palm Springs, California. Just 3 years after the release of the film Fox dusted off the script and refilmed the story with Tom Mix.

Plot
As described in a film magazine, Cyrus Longstreth (Clary), Bully Brome (Nye), and Jeff Lawson (Johnstone), a trio of unprincipled cattlemen, have defied law and order in their cattle rustling activities. Steele (Farnum), a Texas ranger, entering the village alone and under an assumed name, rescues Longstreth's daughter Ray (Lovely) from two Mexican assailants and wins her father's gratitude. After one of the trio murders Steele's best friend, he enters the locality alone, goes to work at Longstreth's ranch, and wins Ray's heart. After several thrilling fights Steele manages to dispose of Brome and confronts Lawson and Longstreth with a charge of murder. Lawson betrays his guilt and is killed in the fight that follows. Longstreth proves his part in the rustling was an involuntary one and Steele and Ray are married.

Cast
 William Farnum as Steele
 Louise Lovely as Ray Longstreth
 G. Raymond Nye as Bully Brome
 Charles Clary as Cyrus Longstreth, alias Cheseldine
 Lamar Johnstone as Jeff Lawson
 Fred Herzog as Joe Laramie (credited as Frederic Herzog)
 Irene Rich as Mrs. Laramie
 Tom London (unknown role) (credited as Leonard Clapham)

See also
 1937 Fox vault fire

References

External links

 
 

1919 films
1919 Western (genre) films
Lost Western (genre) films
Fox Film films
Films directed by J. Gordon Edwards
Films based on works by Zane Grey
American black-and-white films
Films shot in California
Lost American films
1919 lost films
Silent American Western (genre) films
1910s American films
1910s English-language films